Kavita Sidhu (born 29 November 1971) is a Malaysian actress and former beauty queen. She is of Indian Punjabi ancestry.

Career
Sidhu won the Miss Charm International title in 1990. She has been listed in the Malaysia Book of Records as the first Malaysian to have won an international beauty pageant title. Sidhu has modelled for Jean-Louis Scherner in Paris and Escada in Munich. In 2009, Sidhu modelled a RM100million diamond-encrusted dress by Mouawad at the STYLO Fashion Grand Prix KL.

Acting
She has appeared in Malaysian films such as Layar Lara, Mimpi Moon and Pontianak Harum Sundal Malam I & II. She has also delved into theatre productions with Fat Girl's Revenge, which was staged by The Actors Studio.

Venture into fashion
In 2010, Sidhu launched her own clothing line at the STYLO Fashion Grand Prix KL. In 2014, Sidhu was chosen as one of feature designers for the Kuala Lumpur Fashion Week.

Personal life
In January 2016, Sidhu married Italian geologist Roberto Guiati. The wedding reception was held at Grand Hyatt Kuala Lumpur.

Filmography

Film

References

External links

Malaysian beauty pageant winners
Malaysian people of Indian descent
Malaysian people of Punjabi descent
Malaysian Sikhs
Living people
21st-century Malaysian actresses
Malaysian television personalities
Place of birth missing (living people)
1971 births
Malaysian film actresses
Pesona Pictures contract players
People from Ipoh